Liotinaria is a genus of sea snails, marine gastropod mollusks, in the family Liotiidae.

Species
Species within the genus Liotinaria include:
 Liotinaria peronii (Kiener, 1838)
 Liotinaria scalarioides (Reeve, 1843)
 Liotinaria semiclathratula (Schrenck, 1862)
 Liotinaria solidula (Gould, 1859)

References

 Habe T. (1955). Illustrated catalogue of Japanese shells, series B. 24 single unnumbered pages in English and Japanese: 1-12

Liotiidae